Callum Alexander Connolly (born 23 September 1997) is an English professional footballer who plays as a defender or midfielder for Blackpool. He has previously played for Everton, Barnsley, Wigan Athletic, Ipswich Town, Bolton Wanderers, Lincoln City and Fleetwood Town.

A versatile player, Connolly can play anywhere across the back four of defence and in midfield.

Career

Everton
After playing with Crosby Stuart, Connolly joined Everton at the age of nine. He has earned representation at England under-17 and under-18 level. On 3 March 2016, he joined League One side Barnsley on a one-month loan deal. He made his debut two days later, in a 3–1 win over Walsall at the Bescot Stadium.

Connolly made his first Everton teamsheet on 16 April 2016, when he was named as a substitute for the 1–1 draw with Southampton, coming on as a second-half substitute for injured right-back Seamus Coleman to make his Premier League debut.

On 14 January 2017, Connolly signed on loan for Wigan Athletic until the end of the season, and just hours later made his debut and scored both goals as Wigan beat Burton Albion 2–0.

For the 2017–2018 season, Connolly played on loan for Ipswich Town in the EFL Championship. Used largely in central midfield for the first time in his career, Connolly returned to Everton at the end of the season, having played an impressive 36 matches, scoring four goals.

At the beginning of the  2018–19 season Connolly re-joined Wigan Athletic on loan, initially for the whole of the season but on 31 January 2019 he was recalled by Everton and sent on loan for the second half of the season to Bolton Wanderers

On 29 August 2019, Connolly headed out on loan once more, this time joining League One side Lincoln City on a season-long deal, but he returned to Everton early, after his loan spell was cut short in January.

Connolly signed with Fleetwood Town on 6 January 2020 on a loan deal for the rest of the 2019–20 season.

At the end of the 2020–21 it was announced that Connolly would leave the club at the end of his contract.

Blackpool
Connolly signed for Blackpool in July 2021 after becoming a free agent.

International career
Connolly received his first international call up when he was named in the England under-17 squad for the 2014 Algarve Tournament. Connolly made his debut against eventual winners Germany in the final group stage game, with England finishing runners-up in the tournament. 10 days later, he was named in the squad for the elite round of qualification for the 2014 UEFA European Under-17 Championship, and helped England qualify by starting the wins against Czech Republic and Italy. Connolly was not named in the squad for the final tournament, which England went on to win after beating the Netherlands on penalties in the final.

Connolly was part of the England squad for the 2016 UEFA European Under-19 Championship, and started the first game, a 2–1 win against France. However, he sustained an injury in the second half of the match, and withdrew from the squad six days later. After also beating the Netherlands and Croatia to top the group, England were eventually eliminated in the semi-finals against Italy.

Connolly was selected for the England under-20 team in the 2017 FIFA U-20 World Cup. He played in the opening match against Argentina and the second against Guinea, but was unused as a substitute in the final that England won, their first win in a global tournament since their World Cup victory of 1966.

Connolly played in four of the five matches as the England under-21 team won the 2018 Toulon Tournament, including scoring against Scotland in the semi-final.

Career statistics

Honours
England U20
FIFA U-20 World Cup: 2017

England U21
Toulon Tournament: 2018

References

External links
England profile at The FA

1997 births
Living people
Footballers from Liverpool
English footballers
England youth international footballers
Association football defenders
Everton F.C. players
Barnsley F.C. players
Wigan Athletic F.C. players
Ipswich Town F.C. players
Bolton Wanderers F.C. players
Lincoln City F.C. players
Fleetwood Town F.C. players
Blackpool F.C. players
English Football League players
Premier League players